= Damien MaMa =

Damien Mama
- Damien Mama in 2021

Damien Mama, born on September 26, 1972 (54 years old) in Benin, is a senior official and diplomat of the United Nations (UN). Since July 2026, he has been the Deputy Special Representative of the UN Secretary-General and Deputy Head of MONUSCO, as well as the UN Resident Coordinator and Humanitarian Coordinator in the Democratic Republic of the Congo.

== Biography ==
=== Stadies ===
Damien Mama has a master's degree in development management from Ruhr University in Bochum (Germany), and a master's degree in land planning from the University of Abomey-Calavi (Benin).

=== Professional career ===
Damien Mama works with several African governments on improving public policies, managing development and peacebuilding programs, and humanitarian efforts in several countries, including Burundi, Togo, the DRC, and a few others.

IIn September 2021, he was appointed United Nations Resident Coordinator in Burundi by the United Nations Secretary-General, Antonio Guterres.

In June 2018, he held the position of Resident Coordinator of the United Nations System and Resident Representative of UNDP in Togo.

He also holds several other positions within UNDP. He is thus Head of the Oversight Team for the 45 country programmes at the UNDP Regional Bureau for Africa in New York; Director of the Stabilization and Recovery Section within the United Nations Multidimensional Integrated Stabilization Mission in Mali (MINUSMA); Deputy Resident Representative of UNDP in Togo; Advisor on Public Policy and Planning at the Office of the Resident Coordinator in South Sudan; and Coordinator of the Community Recovery Programme at UNDP in the DRC.
